Seyyed Ali-Asghar Gharavi is an Iranian scholar of religion and political activist affiliated with the Freedom Movement of Iran.

According to the American magazine In These Times, he is "one of Iran's most prominent pro-democracy activists and political thinkers".

In 1998, he was arrested and summoned to the Special Clerical Court for criticizing the regime, despite the fact he is not a cleric. In 2013, Bahar newspaper was banned for publishing an article written by Gharavi, titled “Imam Ali, a Political Leader or a Religious Model?”. He was accused of "blasphemy" for implicitly challenging Iran's Supreme Leader.

References

Living people
21st-century Iranian writers
Saint Joseph University alumni
Freedom Movement of Iran politicians
Muslim reformers
Prisoners and detainees of Iran
Amnesty International prisoners of conscience held by Iran
Iranian male writers
20th-century Iranian writers
1940s births
Members of the Association for Defense of Freedom and the Sovereignty of the Iranian Nation
Members of the National Council for Peace